Chróścice  (German Chrosczütz, 1935-45: Rutenau) is a village in the administrative district of Gmina Dobrzeń Wielki, within Opole County, Opole Voivodeship, in south-western Poland.

The village has a population of 3,000.

References

Villages in Opole County